The 2022 Canberra Raiders Cup will be the 24th season of the cup, the top division Rugby League club competition in Canberra. The 2022 Canberra Raiders Cup will consist of 18 regular season rounds that will begin on 2 April and end on 27 August. There will be 3 playoff rounds, beginning on 3 September with the first semi-final, and ending on 18 September with the Grand Final.

Canberra Raiders Cup (First Grade)

Teams 
There will be 9 teams playing in 2022. 5 teams from Canberra, 2 from Queanbeyan, 1 from Yass, and 1 from Goulburn.

Ladder

Ladder progression 

 Numbers highlighted in green indicate that the team finished the round inside the top 4.
 Numbers highlighted in blue indicates the team finished first on the ladder in that round.
 Numbers highlighted in red indicates the team finished last place on the ladder in that round.
 Underlined numbers indicate that the team had a bye during that round.

 = Ahead of their round 17 match, Queanbeyan United was stripped of three competition points for salary cap breaches.

Season results

Round 1

Round 2

Round 3

Round 4

Round 5

Round 6

Round 7

Round 8

Round 9

Round 10

Round 11

Round 12

Round 13

Round 14

Round 15

Round 16

Round 17

Round 18

Finals Series

Grand Final

Reserve Grade

Teams

Ladder

Ladder progression 

 Numbers highlighted in green indicate that the team finished the round inside the top 4.
 Numbers highlighted in blue indicates the team finished first on the ladder in that round.
 Numbers highlighted in red indicates the team finished last place on the ladder in that round.
 Underlined numbers indicate that the team had a bye during that round.

 = After their round 3 match, Queanbeyan United was stripped of two competition points for on-field conduct.

Season results

Round 1

Round 2

Round 3

Round 4

Round 5

Round 6

Round 7

Round 8

Round 9

Round 10

Round 11

Round 12

Round 13

Round 14

Round 15

Round 16

Round 17

Round 18

Finals Series

Grand Final

George Tooke Shield (Second Division) 
There will be 9 teams playing in 2022. 3 teams from Canberra. 6 teams from New South Wales towns surrounding Canberra.

Ladder

Ladder Progression 

 Numbers highlighted in green indicate that the team finished the round inside the top 5.
 Numbers highlighted in blue indicates the team finished first on the ladder in that round.
 Numbers highlighted in red indicates the team finished last place on the ladder in that round.
Underlined numbers indicate that the team had a bye during that round.

Season Results

Round 1

Round 2

Round 3

Round 4

Round 5

Round 6

Round 7

Round 8

Round 9

Round 10

Round 11

Round 12

Round 13

Round 14

Round 15

Finals Series

Grand Final

Katrina Fanning Shield (Open Women's Tackle)

Teams

Ladder

Ladder Progression 

 Numbers highlighted in green indicate that the team finished the round inside the top 5.
 Numbers highlighted in yellow indicate that the team finished the round outside the top 5.
 Numbers highlighted in blue indicates the team finished first on the ladder in that round.
Underlined numbers indicate that the team had a bye during that round.

Season Results

Round 1

Round 2

Round 3

Round 4

Round 5

Round 6

Round 7

Round 8

Round 9

Round 10

Round 11

Round 12

Round 13

Round 14

Division 1 Finals Series

Grand Final

Division 2 Finals Series

Grand Final

Under 19s

Teams

Ladder

Ladder Progression 

 Numbers highlighted in green indicate that the team finished the round inside the top 4.
 Numbers highlighted in blue indicates the team finished first on the ladder in that round.
 Numbers highlighted in red indicates the team finished last place on the ladder in that round.
Underlined numbers indicate that the team had a bye during that round.

Season Results

Round 1

Round 2

Round 3

Round 4

Round 5

Round 6

Round 7

Round 8

Round 9

Round 10

Round 11

Round 12

Round 13

Round 14

Division 1 Finals Series

Grand Final

Division 2 Finals Series

Grand Final

Canberra Raiders Cup Ladies League Tag

Teams

Ladder

Ladder progression 

 Numbers highlighted in green indicate that the team finished the round inside the top 4.
 Numbers highlighted in blue indicates the team finished first on the ladder in that round.
 Numbers highlighted in red indicates the team finished last place on the ladder in that round.
 Underlined numbers indicate that the team had a bye during that round.

Season results

Round 1

Round 2

Round 3

Round 4

Round 5

Round 6

Round 7

Round 8

Round 9

Round 10

Round 11

Round 12

Round 13

Round 14

Round 15

Round 16

Round 17

Round 18

Finals Series

Grand Final

Second Division Ladies League Tag

Teams

Ladder

Ladder Progression 
 Numbers highlighted in green indicate that the team finished the round inside the top 5.
 Numbers highlighted in blue indicates the team finished first on the ladder in that round.
 Numbers highlighted in red indicates the team finished last place on the ladder in that round.
 Underlined numbers indicate that the team had a bye during that round.

Season Results

Round 1

Round 2

Round 3

Round 4

Round 5

Round 6

Round 7

Round 8

Round 9

Round 10

Round 11

Round 12

Round 13

Round 14

Round 15

Finals Series

Grand Final

Categories 
:Category:Sport in Canberra

References 

Rugby league in Australia